An independent water and power plant (IWPP) or an integrated water and power project, is a combined facility which serves as both a desalination plant and a power plant. IWPPs are more common in the Middle East, where demand for both electricity and salt water desalinisation are high.

Independent water and power producers negotiate both a feed-in power tariff and a water tariff in the same deal with the utility company, who also purchases both products. IWPPs tend to have an installed capacity of over 1 gigawatt (1,000 megawatts) and generates power in a typical thermal power station setup. Seawater is purified by integrating MSF, MED, TVC, or RO water desalination technologies with the power plant, thus increasing overall efficiency.

See also 
 Independent Power Producer

References

External links 
 

 
Cogeneration
Power station technology
Energy conversion
Chemical process engineering
Water desalination
Water treatment